Desmond Olumuyiwa Majekodunmi is a Nigerian environmentalist.  He is the chairman of the Lekki State Urban Forest and Animal Shelter Initiative (LUFASI), and a radio show host of the Green Hour on Nigeria Info 99.3 FM. Majekodunmi is also an author, singer and script writer. In addition to this, he works as a farmer, multi media engineer / producer, film maker and musician.

He has received many awards in recognition of his work on agriculture and the environment. He has won the Nigerian Silverbird TV "Man of the Year" and DW German TV network "Environment Hero". His efforts to get more trees planted were acknowledged with an award from the Ministry of Environment. He is a certified experimental extension farmer for International Institute of Tropical Agriculture (IITA), Ibadan and operates Majekodunmi Agricultural Project (MAP), an agro forestry based conservation farm in Lagos.

He is the son of First Republic federal minister Chief Moses Majekodunmi and his wife Nora Majekodunmi, the founder of Corona Schools.

He recently received an award from Paschal Dozie after giving a lecture on sustainable development and has received several other awards regarding climate change and environmental protection.

Majekodunmi serves as the current chairman of the Awareness and Fund Raising committee of the Nigeria Conservation Foundation (NCF), Lagos, and is a practitioner of conservation farming.

References 

Nigerian environmentalists
1950 births
Living people